Kristian Järvinen (born July 29, 1992) is a Finnish professional ice hockey goaltender. He is currently playing for TUTO Hockey of the Finnish Mestis.

Kristian Järvinen made his Liiga debut playing with TPS during the 2014-15 Liiga season.

References

External links

1992 births
Living people
Finnish ice hockey goaltenders
HPK players
KooKoo players
HC TPS players
TuTo players
Sportspeople from Turku